The Aguacateros de Peribán F.C. is a Mexican football club based in Peribán. The club was founded in 2020, and currently plays in the Liga TDP.

History
The team was founded in 2020, beginning to compete that same year in the Liga TDP. In its existence the team has always qualified for the final phase of the tournament, although being eliminated in the Round of 16 on both occasions.

Due to its good performances in the Liga TDP, Aguacateros de Peribán was able to participate in the first edition of the Copa Conecta, finally on March 8, 2022, the team won the trophy after defeating C.D. Muxes in the penalty shoot-out. Previously the team had eliminated the clubs Gorilas de Juanacatlán, Estudiantes de Querétaro, Tecos and Saltillo Soccer.

Honors
Copa Conecta Champions: 1
2021–22

Players

First-team squad

References 

Association football clubs established in 2020
Football clubs in Michoacán
2020 establishments in Mexico